Ressia auriculata is a moth in the family Cosmopterigidae found in China (Henan, Shaanxi, Sichuan).

The wingspan is 10–11.5 mm. The forewings are blackish brown with a narrow straight silvery white fascia. The costal margin has a wedged white spot and another wedged white spot before the tornus. The hindwings are also blackish brown.

Etymology
The species name refers to the shape of the cucullus in the male genitalia and is derived from Latin auriculatus (meaning auriculate).

References

Natural History Museum Lepidoptera generic names catalog

Cosmopteriginae